Gordon DeGraffenreid is a former American football coach.  He was the first head football coach at MidAmerica Nazarene University in Olathe, Kansas, serving for 12 seasons, from 1979 to 1990, and compiling a record of 41–53.

References

Year of birth missing (living people)
Living people
MidAmerica Nazarene Pioneers football coaches
Gordon